Hatipoğlu can refer to:

 Hatipoğlu, Kastamonu
 Hatipoğlu, Kayapınar